Thijmen Goppel (born 16 February 1997) is a Dutch professional footballer who plays as a winger for German 3. Liga side SV Wehen Wiesbaden.

Club career

Early years
After three years, where he was unable to break through to the first team, he was scooped up by ADO Den Haag.

ADO Den Haag
Goppel made the first professional appearance of his career early in the 2017–18 season, where he was substituted in for the injured Elson Hooi in the 90th minute of a match against VVV-Venlo. He had an immediate impact, as stood for the assist to Bjørn Johnsen's goal, which would secure a 2–0 win for ADO. ADO head coach Alfons Groenendijk brought Goppel with the first team on training camp to the Turkish Belek during the winter break. During this training camp he signed his first professional contract with ADO, keeping him in De Hofstad until summer 2020. Goppel would eventually go on to make 15 appearances in that season, and won the ADO Talent of the Season award for his performances in the 2017–18 season.

MVV Maastricht (loan)
On 2 September 2019, Goppel signed a one-year loan deal with Dutch second division side, MVV Maastricht.

Roda JC
In June 2020 he moved to Roda JC Kerkrade. He appeared consistently during the season for the club. A year after coming to Kerkrade, Goppel wanted to complete a transfer to German 3. Liga club SV Wehen Wiesbaden, but according to the player, Roda's asking price was too high.

Wehen Wiesbaden
In July 2021, Goppel nonetheless signed for SV Wehen Wiesbaden on a two-year contract. He made his debut on 26 July in a 0–0 league draw against SC Freiburg II.

References

External links
 
 

1997 births
Living people
Association football forwards
Dutch footballers
ADO Den Haag players
MVV Maastricht players
Eredivisie players
Eerste Divisie players
NEC Nijmegen players
Alphense Boys players
People from Kaag en Braassem
Footballers from South Holland
Roda JC Kerkrade players
SV Wehen Wiesbaden players
3. Liga players